Sodam is a mandal in Palamaner Revenue Division of Chittoor district in the southern Indian state of Andhra Pradesh.

References 

Villages in Chittoor district